Hudson Ford were a UK rock band-style duo, formed when John Ford and Richard Hudson left Strawbs in 1973. The original line-up featured Hudson (now playing guitar instead of drums) and Ford along with Chris Parren on keyboards, Mickey Keen on guitars, and Gerry Conway on drums. Conway left in May 1974 prior to the recording of Free Spirit and was replaced by Ken Laws. Mickey Keen left the band in December 1974 and was replaced briefly by Mick Clarke, formerly of The Roy Young Band. Clarke moved to the United States in 1975 and was not replaced. The line-up remained stable from that point until the group dissolved in late 1977.

The first album Nickelodeon also featured session musicians including Rick Wakeman.
 
In 1979 they re-surfaced billed as The Monks.

Hudson and Ford had been in Elmer Gantry's Velvet Opera in the mid 1960s and they both left that group and joined Strawbs, where they stayed until forming Hudson Ford.

Personnel
John Ford – vocals, bass guitar, guitar (1973-1977)
Richard Hudson – vocals, guitar, sitar (1973-1977)
Chris Parren – keyboards (1973-1977)
Mickey Keen - guitar (1973-1974; died 2008)
Gerry Conway - drums (1973-1974)
Ken Laws – drums (1974-1977; died 2007)
Mick Clarke - guitar (1974-1975)

Discography

Albums
Nickelodeon (A&M 1973)
Free Spirit (A&M 1974)
Worlds Collide (A&M 1975)
Repertoire (1976) - compilation
Daylight (1977)
Hudson Ford - The A&M Albums (Universal Music Group/Caroline Records 2017)

Singles

See also
List of performers on Top of the Pops
List of former A&M Records artists

References

External links
 

English rock music groups
Musical groups established in 1973
English musical duos
Rock music duos